The Bulgarian Football Union ( BFS) is a football association based in Bulgaria and a member of UEFA. It organizes a football league, Bulgarian Parva Liga, and fields its Bulgaria national football team in UEFA and FIFA-authorised competitions.

A legal entity that it claims descent from was founded in 1923 as the football department of the Bulgarian National Sports Federation, which existed until the Soviet invasion of 1944. The football governing body was then known as the Central Football Committee until 1948, the Republican Section for Football from 1948 until 1962 and the Bulgarian Football Federation from 1962 until 1985. On 27 June 1985, the organization was renamed the Bulgarian Football Union, the name that it carries today.

Presidents

Competitions

It organizes the following competitions:
Men's football
 First League, 1st level
 Second League, 2nd level
 Third League (4 divisions), 3rd level
 Regional Groups, 4th and 5th level
 Bulgarian Cup
 Bulgarian Supercup
 Cup of AFL (amateur cup)

Youth football
 Elite League; First league for academy sides, with three age categories, Under 19, Under 17s and Under 15s sides

Women's football
 Bulgarian Women's League (or Swiss Capital League); First Women's Division
 Bulgarian Women's Cup

National teams
The Bulgarian Football Union also organizes national football teams representing Bulgaria at all age levels:
Men's
 Bulgaria national football team (currently managed by Mladen Krstajić)
 Bulgaria U21 national football team (currently managed by Aleksandar Dimitrov)
 Bulgaria U19 national football team (currently managed by Angel Stoykov)
 Bulgaria U18 national football team (currently managed by Angel Stoykov)
 Bulgaria U17 national football team (currently managed by Yordan Petkov)
 Bulgaria U16 national football team (currently managed by Marcho Dafchev)
 Bulgaria U15 national football team (currently managed by Stefan Kolev)

Women's
 Bulgaria women's national football team (currently managed by Silvia Radoyska)

Futsal
 Bulgaria national futsal team (currently managed by Bogomil Marev)

References

External links 
  
Bulgaria at FIFA site
Bulgaria at UEFA site

UEFA member associations
Football in Bulgaria
Futsal in Bulgaria
Organizations based in Sofia
1923 establishments in Bulgaria
Sports organizations established in 1923
Football